Włodzimierz Puchalski (March 6, 1908 – January 19, 1979) was a Polish photographer and film director.

Life
Puchalski was born in Velyki Mosty, near Lwów (then in Austria-Hungary, now Lviv in Ukraine). He studied at the Politechnika Lwowska to become an agronomic engineer. He began his photographic career while in the Cadet Corps and during his college studies, initially photographing waterfowl in the fish ponds at Żółkiew (Zhovkva) from hideouts made of grass, and, later, carnivorous birds in Sokal. He also recorded hunting scenes of the Polish nobility. He was the first person to use the term "bloodless hunt" to describe hunting wildlife with the use of film and a still photo camera.

During World War II, he worked as a forest ranger in the Sandomierz Forest only to return to his passion after the war. He joined forces with the Łódź educational film company Wytwórnia Filmów Oświatowych w Łodzi and, travelling throughout Poland, took photographs of nature subjects: flocks of migratory birds on the Biebrza and Narew rivers, as well as wisent, elk, wolves, lynx, beavers, deer and smaller animals.

On Spitsbergen, he gathered substantive material about the fauna of the archipelago; in the Polish research station on King George Island in the Antarctic, he photographed penguins, sea lions, whale bones and birds. He died while filming skuas.

Film festival
The Włodzimierz Puchalski International Nature Film Festival is held yearly in Łódź in Puchalski's honour.

Death
Puchalski was assigned to the third polar expedition headed by Stanislaw Rakusa-Suszczewski and arrived at the Henryk Arctowski Polish Antarctic Station in 1978. He died on 19 January 1979 while working at the station and was buried on a hill to the south of the station.

References

External links
Włodzimierz Puchalski International Nature Film Festival

1908 births
1979 deaths
Lviv Polytechnic alumni
Photographers from Lviv
Polish film directors
Nature photographers
Antarctic expedition deaths
People from Lviv Oblast